Fahmi El-Shami is a former Libyan soccer player who played in the NPSL.

Career statistics

Club

Notes

References

Living people
Libyan footballers
Libyan expatriate footballers
Association football forwards
San Diego Sockers players
Canton Invaders players
Hershey Impact players
Chicago Power players
Dayton Dynamo players
Milwaukee Wave players
Atlanta Silverbacks players
National Professional Soccer League (1984–2001) players
Expatriate soccer players in the United States
Libyan expatriate sportspeople in the United States
People from Benghazi
Year of birth missing (living people)